Olivier Hanlan (born February 15, 1993) is a Canadian professional basketball player for Gaziantep Basketbol of the Basketbol Süper Ligi (BSL). He played college basketball for the Boston College Eagles of the NCAA and was the first player for Boston College since Troy Bell to win conference rookie of the year honors.

High school career 
Hanlan attended New Hampton School in New Hampshire for his junior and senior years.  He earned first team All-NEPSAC AAA team honors as a senior.

College recruitment

|}

Hanlan also got offers from Dayton, Iowa, Northeastern, Notre Dame, Rice, TCU, Virginia, and Virginia Tech.

College career

Freshman season (2012–2013)
As a freshman, Hanlan started all 33 games.  He arrived with most of the players being either freshman or sophomores.  During Hanlan's freshman season, he scored 15.4 points per game and led his team to the quarterfinals in the 2013 ACC Men's Basketball Tournament.  Hanlan's first breakout game as a freshman was on November 21, 2012, vs. Auburn when he had 19 points and made the game-winning shot in a 50–49 victory for the Eagles.  After that game, Hanlan was very consistent including having 17 vs. Miami, 22 vs. UNC, and 20 vs. Duke.  However, he did miss a free throw vs. Miami (FL) that would have sent the game into overtime, and missed a shot that would have won the game vs. Duke.  From mid-February until the end of the season, Hanlan scored 12+ points every game.  His second breakout game was on February 19, 2013, vs. Maryland when he scored a career high 26 points in a 69–58 win for the Eagles.  Hanlan then set an ACC Basketball Tournament freshman record for scoring with 41 points against Georgia Tech on March 14, 2013.  The Eagles won 84–64.  Hanlan went on to win ACC rookie of the year.

Stats

Professional career

NBA draft
On June 25, 2015, Hanlan was selected with the 42nd overall pick in the 2015 NBA draft by the Utah Jazz. He later joined the Jazz for the 2015 NBA Summer League where he averaged 4.1 points and 2.6 rebounds in eight games.

Žalgiris Kaunas (2015—2016)
On August 8, 2015, Hanlan signed a one-year deal (with the option of a second) with Lithuanian powerhouse, Žalgiris Kaunas.

Le Mans Sarthe Basket (2016—2017)
However, on August 2, 2016, Hanlan joined Le Mans Sarthe Basket of the LNB Pro A.

Austin Spurs (2017—2018)
On November 2, 2017, Hanlan was included in the 2017–18 opening night roster for Austin Spurs. 

On September 21, 2018, Hanlan signed with San Antonio Spurs, who had acquired his draft rights from the Utah Jazz for Boris Diaw and a 2022 2nd-round draft pick on July 5, 2016.  However, he was waived only a few days later, even before the start of training camp.

Telekom Baskets Bonn (2018–2019)
On November 27, 2018, Telekom Baskets Bonn of the Basketball Bundesliga announced their signing of Hanlan.

Ottawa Blackjacks (2020)
On July 16, 2020, the Ottawa Blackjacks of the Canadian Elite Basketball League announced the signing of Hanlan for the upcoming two-week-long CEBL summer series. In eight games, Hanlan averaged 12.5 points, 4.3 rebounds and 2.9 assists per game.

Iraklis Thessaloniki (2019–2021)
On July 27, 2019, Hanlan signed with newly promoted Iraklis Thessaloniki of the Greek Basket League. After a productive season averaging 16.3 points, 3.5 rebounds, and 3.4 assists per game, Hanlan extended his contract with the Greek club for one more year on July 29, 2020. In his second season, he was named as one of the three team captains, along with Dimitrios Verginis and Vassilis Kavvadas. Overall, Hanlan averaged 13.4 points (shooting 34.6% from beyond the arc and 39.2% from the field), as well as 2.8 assists, playing 29 minutes per contest.

Aris Thessaloniki (2021–2022)
On August 7, 2021, Hanlan signed with fellow Greek Basket League club Aris Thessaloniki, where he was named team captain alongside Stavros Schizas. In 15 games, he averaged a career-high of 20.8 points (shooting with 38% from the 3-point line), 3.5 rebounds, 2.9 assists and 0.9 steals, playing around 33 minutes per contest.

Valencia (2022)
Hanlan's performances with Aris grabbed the attention of many European clubs and on April 5, 2022, he signed with EuroCup contenders Valencia of the Liga ACB, replacing the injured Klemen Prepelič for the rest of the season. In 11 league games, he averaged 7.5 points, 1 rebound and 1.1 assists per contest. On June 9, 2022, Hanlan was released from the Spanish club.

Gaziantep Basketbol (2022–present)
On November 8, 2022, he signed with Gaziantep Basketbol of the Basketbol Süper Ligi (BSL).

Stats

National team career
Hanlan was a member of the Canadian Under-17 national team that finished third in the 2010 FIBA Under-17 World Cup in Germany. Hanlan led his team in scoring, in the bronze medal game against Lithuania, with 15 points. He also had 4 assists and 5 rebounds. He was also a member of the Canadian Under-19 national team that competed in Latvia, at the 2011 FIBA Under-19 World Cup. 

In August 2017, Hanlan was a member of the Canadian Senior Men's National Team that competed at the 2017 FIBA AmeriCup. Hanlan scored a team-high 10 points, to go along with three rebounds and three assists, in a loss to the U.S. Virgin Islands. Then in November 2017, Hanlan was a member of the Canadian Senior Men's National Team that competed at the 2019 FIBA Basketball World Cup Americas qualifiers.

References

External links
FIBA profile
EuroLeague profile
Eurobasket.com profile
Boston College Eagles bio
Rivals.com profile

1993 births
Living people
Aris B.C. players
Austin Spurs players
Basketball people from Quebec
BC Žalgiris players
Black Canadian basketball players
Boston College Eagles men's basketball players
Canadian expatriate basketball people in France
Canadian expatriate basketball people in Germany
Canadian expatriate basketball people in Greece
Canadian expatriate basketball people in Lithuania
Canadian expatriate basketball people in Spain
Canadian expatriate basketball people in the United States
Canadian men's basketball players
Gaziantep Basketbol players
New Hampton School alumni
Iraklis Thessaloniki B.C. players
Le Mans Sarthe Basket players
Point guards
Shooting guards
Sportspeople from Gatineau
Telekom Baskets Bonn players
Utah Jazz draft picks
Valencia Basket players